In 1970, Los Angeles Dodgers owner Walter O'Malley stepped down as team president, turning the reins over to his son Peter, while remaining as the team's chairman. The Dodgers remained competitive, finishing the season in second place, 14½ games behind the NL Champion Cincinnati Reds in the National League West.

Regular season

Season standings

Record vs. opponents

Opening Day lineup

Notable transactions 
 August 21, 1970: Jerry Royster was signed as an amateur free agent by the Dodgers.
 August 24, 1970: Sergio Ferrer was signed as an amateur free agent by the Dodgers.
 September 28, 1970: Fred Norman was purchased from the Dodgers by the St. Louis Cardinals.

Roster

First major league foul ball injury death

On May 16, the Dodgers were playing a home game against the Giants when, during the third inning, Mota fouled off a Gaylord Perry pitch into the stands near first base. It struck Alan Fish, 14, attending the game with other boys from his nearby recreational baseball team and their coach. Fish was unconscious for a minute, and spoke incoherently when he reawakened and, while his speech had recovered, needed assistance walking to the Dodger Stadium's first-aid center.

There, he seemed to have recovered completely. The stadium doctor did not ask whether he had lost consciousness or check his blood pressure, and released him after giving him two aspirin for the lingering pain. He returned to his seat and watched the rest of the game normally, even trying to get autographs from the Dodgers afterwards. However, on his return home he began experiencing dizziness, shaking and crying, and his parents decided to take him to a hospital.

Two hospitals were unable to take the boy immediately, even as his condition deteriorated, and he was not admitted until early the next morning. His condition at first improved, but then became even worse, and a neurosurgeon discovered a large mass at the site of the injury. Before he could operate, however, Fish suffered a convulsion that left him brain dead, and three days later he died after being taken off life support.

The autopsy found that Fish had died due to an intracerebral hemorrhage after the hairline fracture caused by the foul ball had pushed a piece of his skull into his brain. Had he been required to rest and hospitalized immediately afterward, the neurosurgeon believed he could have recovered completely. The Fishes sued the Dodgers, the stadium physician and the two hospitals that had not been able to treat their son for negligence and medical malpractice; at trial, after dropping the other hospitals, the jury found for the team and doctor. However, an appeals court reversed that verdict three years later due to a jury instruction that should have been given but was not.

Player stats

Batting

Starters by position 
Note: Pos = Position; G = Games played; AB = At bats; H = Hits; Avg. = Batting average; HR = Home runs; RBI = Runs batted in

Other batters 
Note: G = Games played; AB = At bats; H = Hits; Avg. = Batting average; HR = Home runs; RBI = Runs batted in

Pitching

Starting pitchers 
Note: G = Games pitched; IP = Innings pitched; W = Wins; L = Losses; ERA = Earned run average; SO = Strikeouts

Other pitchers 
Note: G = Games pitched; IP = Innings pitched; W = Wins; L = Losses; ERA = Earned run average; SO = Strikeouts

Relief pitchers 
Note: G = Games pitched; W = Wins; L = Losses; SV = Saves; ERA = Earned run average; SO = Strikeouts

Awards and honors 
Gold Glove Award
Wes Parker
NL Player of the Month
Bill Singer (July 1970)

All-Stars 
1970 Major League Baseball All-Star Game
Billy Grabarkewitz reserve
Claude Osteen reserve

Farm system 

LEAGUE CHAMPIONS: Albuquerque, Bakersfield

1970 Major League Baseball Draft

This was the sixth year of a Major League Baseball Draft.  The Dodgers drafted 45 players in the June draft and 9 in the January draft.

The most notable pick in this years draft was pitcher Doug Rau, who was selected with the 1st pick in the June Secondary draft out of Texas A&M University. Rau would play for the Dodgers from 1972–1979 and made 184 starts for the team, with an 80–58 record and 3.30 ERA before spending his final season with the California Angels in 1981.

The first pick in the regular June draft was pitcher Jim Haller from Creighton Prep High School. Haller was 18–18 in 123 minor league games over six seasons, with a 3.65 ERA.

Notes

References 
Baseball-Reference season page
Baseball Almanac season page

External links 
1970 Los Angeles Dodgers uniform
Los Angeles Dodgers official web site

Los Angeles Dodgers seasons
Los Angeles Dodgers season
1970 in sports in California